Kurban is a term for animal sacrifice in:
Islam, see qurbani
Judaism, see korban
the Balkans, see kourbania

It may also refer to:

Given name
 Kurban Günebakan (born 1978), Turkish boxer
 Kurban Kurbanov  (born 1985), freestyle wrestler from Uzbekistan 
 Kurban Said, pseudonym of the author Azerbaijani–UkrainianLev Nussimbaum (1905–1942)
 Kurban Tulum (1883-1975), Uyghur treated by the Communist Party of China as a symbol of unity with the Uyghurs
 Naheed Kurban Nenshi (born 1972), Canadian politician

Surname
 Olga Kurban (born 1987), Russian female heptathlete
 Roy Kurban, American Taekwondo martial arts grandmaster

Other uses
 Kurban (band), a Turkish rock band

See also
 Kurbaan (disambiguation)